The Wynne Prize is an Australian landscape painting or figure sculpture art prize. As one of Australia's longest-running art prizes, it was established in 1897 from the bequest of Richard Wynne. Now held concurrently with the Sir John Sulman Prize and the Archibald Prize at the Art Gallery of New South Wales in Sydney.

It is awarded annually for "the best landscape painting of Australian scenery in oils or watercolours or for the best example of figure sculpture by Australian artists completed during the 12 months preceding the [closing] date".

Many of Australia's most famous artists have won the prize, including William Dobell, Brett Whiteley, Hans Heysen, Gloria Petyarre, Lloyd Rees, Fred Williams, William Robinson, Eric Smith, Nyapanyapa Yunupingu, and Sali Herman.

In 2010, the prize awarded was A$25,000, but the painting by Sam Leach which was awarded the prize, was later revealed to be a close copy of the 17th-century painting Boatmen Moored on the Shore of an Italian Lake by Adam Pijnacker. Concern was expressed that the prize had been awarded to a painting which did not fulfil the prize's criteria. Nevertheless, the trustees of the Art Gallery of New South Wales decided that the award would stand.

List of winners

References

 
Awards established in 1897
1897 establishments in Australia
<ref>https://www.artgallery.nsw.gov.au/prizes/wynne/ </ref?